Dharmarathnakara Rai Bahadur Arcot Narrainsawmy Mudaliar (14 May 18279 February 1910) was a philanthropist with a strong affinity for social reform. He founded the R.B.A.N.M.'s Educational Charities and R.B.A.N.M.'s Chattram and other charities. He belongs to the Arcot Mudaliar community.

Early life
Narrainswamy Mudaliar was born at Arcot on 14 May 1827. Due to some family misfortune, his father Muniappa Mudaliar migrated to Bangalore with his three sons Narrainswamy, Muniswamy and Muthuswamy. Muniappa Mudaliar died when Narrainswamy was ten years old. The youngster had to support his widowed mother and two younger brothers. He never had an opportunity to study English, but was well versed in his mother-tongue of Tamil. During his formative years he studied and acquired a deep knowledge of ancient Tamil literature, which moulded his character and inspired his thoughts and outlook throughout his life. Mudaliar married Govindammal in 1850 when he was 23.

Enterprises
Mudaliar commenced his commercial activity initially as a travelling salesman transporting vegetables which were available at a low price in Bangalore, and selling them at Madras, where they were in great demand. After gaining considerable profit and experience from this trade, he started transporting salt from Madras and selling it in Bangalore. He earned considerable profit from this two-way trade. With this capital, he opened a grocery shop on Cavalry road and later a branch in the Infantry Barracks. In the year 1859, he was granted the Royal patronage of Krishnaraja Wodeyar III, the Maharaja of Mysore. As a token of gratitude to his Royal Patron, Mudaliar named his Emporium on Cavalry road as ‘Mysore Hall’. Later, Mudaliar ventured into a new line of business with Messrs. Wallace & Co. in partnership with Rai Bahadur Bansilal-Ramrathan, who had secured from Col. Sankey, Chief Engineer to the Government of Mysore, the contract for the construction of the New Public Offices or the 'Athara Cutcherry'. The contract was a success under the supervision of Munisawmy Mudaliar, the younger brother of Mudaliar. This line of business brought him a large fortune. Mudaliar set up the ‘Bangalore Agency’ at premises No.19 South Parade. This firm dealt with real estate, livestock, auctioneering etc., involving the army as well as the general public. Mudaliar was also engaged in other commercial activities such as excise contracts, banking etc.

Idealism
Mudaliar believed that wealth was a trust to be utilised for assisting and uplifting the poor, and that diffusion of knowledge is philanthropy at its best - perennial, self-propagating and showering its blessings on future generations. The then prevailing situation impressed on his keen and observant mind that the basic needs of the day were facilities for educating both boys and girls, training youth to enable them to commence their lives as useful members of the society and relieving the distress of the poor and ailing as well as the socially backward and downtrodden. During that period there were no schools for teaching poor children either in their mother tongue or in English, no technical or commerce schools, no schools for Panchamas and other backward classes, no schools for girls, no orphanages for destitute children nor hostels for students in Bangalore.

Philanthropy
Deeply affected by the prevailing pathetic conditions, Mudaliar embarked on his mission of social regeneration, providing for all classes and castes in the fields of education, social welfare and religion. His numerous charities include:
 Subramanyaswamy Temple (1872)
 Muthusawmy Mudaliar Choultry (1872)
 Free English Primary School (1873), upgraded to a High School (1881)
 Thirukulathar School, Halasur (1883)
 Govindammal Girls School, Halasur (1886)
 Technical School for Civil Engineering (1887)
 Muniyappa Mudaliar Muniyammal Orphanage (1892)
 Kannappa Mudaliar Balika Patasala, Kancheepuram (1898)
 Thirukulathar School, Cantonment (1909)

Mudaliar was able to plan and establish centers of education, training and social-upliftment, similar to present day courses and movements such as basic education, vocational and industrial training, girls' education, upliftment of the depressed classes and removal of untouchability.

Endowments and their administration
During the Great Famine of 1876-78, Mysore State Railways was one of the relief works undertaken with the primary objective of meeting the prevailing distress. Due to the famine, the revenue collection had decreased and public debts were mounting. Public loans were floated to undertake public works and provide jobs to the unemployed peasants. Mudaliar invested in the Mysore Railways debentures to provide security to the amount which he had already set-apart for the schools established by him.

Honours and titles
On the occasion of the assumption of the Imperial title of Kaiser'i-Hind, by Queen Victoria, a magnificent durbar was held at Delhi on 1 January 1877. In this durbar, Lord Lytton, the Viceroy of India, conferred on Mudaliar the title of Rai Bahadur in recognition of his acts of charity.

In 1894, Chamaraja Wodeyar X conferred on Mudaliar the title of 'Dharmarathnakara'.

Last days
Mudaliar retired from active life and entrusted the management of his business activities and charities to his nephew. He died on 9 of February 1910, aged 82. A unique honour was accorded him  in permitting his remains to be interred in his own coconut garden at Veerapillai Street. Later, a samadhi was constructed by his grand-nephew, Thangavelu Mudaliar.

References
https://web.archive.org/web/20050102235921/http://www.hinduonnet.com/thehindu/mp/2002/04/25/stories/2002042500450200.htm

Further reading

See also 
 K. P. Puttanna Chetty
 Yele Mallappa Shetty
 Sajjan Rao
 S. Ramaswami Mudaliar
 Janopakari Doddanna Setty

1827 births
1910 deaths
19th-century Indian philanthropists